Pauropods are small, pale, millipede-like arthropods. Around 830 species in twelve families are found worldwide, living in soil and leaf mold. They look rather like centipedes, or millipedes, and may be a sister group of the latter. However, this is controversial, as a close relationship with Symphyla has also been posited.

Anatomy and ecology

They have neither eyes nor hearts, although they do have sensory organs which can detect light. The body segments have ventral tracheal/spiracular pouches forming apodemes similar to those in millipedes and Symphyla, although the trachea usually connected to these structures are absent in most species. There are five pairs of long sensory hairs (trichobothria) located throughout the body segments. Pauropods can usually be identified because of their distinctive anal plate, which is unique to pauropods. Different species of pauropods can be identified based on the size and shape of their anal plate. The antennae are branching, biramous, and segmented, which is distinctive for the group. Pauropods are usually either white or brown.

Pauropods live in the soil, (usually at densities of less than 100 per square metre [9/sq ft]), and under debris and leaf litter.

Discovery 
The first pauropod species to be discovered and described was Pauropus huxleyi, found in London in 1866 by Lord Avebury. He wrote of the creature:Pauropus huxleyi is a bustling, active, neat and cleanly creature. It has, too, a look of cheerful intelligence, which forms a great contrast to the dull stupidity of the Diplopods, or the melancholy ferocity of most Chilopods.'In 1870, Packard discovered a species of North American pauropod, extending the group's range.

Reproduction and development 
Pauropods, like all other myriapods, are gonochoric. Male pauropods place small packets of sperm on the ground, which the females then use to impregnate themselves with.They then deposit the fertilized eggs on the ground. Parthogenesis can occur in some species, especially when environmental conditions are unfavourable. Eggs undergo a short pupal stage before emerging as the first larval instar, which can have three or six pairs of legs depending on which order the species belongs to- Tetramerocerata start with three pairs and progress through instars with five, then six, then eight pairs of legs, up to nine or ten pairs as adults. In contrast, the first instar larvae of Hexamerocerata have six pairs of legs, and eleven as adults (see Evolution and Systematics).

Evolution and systematics
Only one fossil species has been reported: Eopauropus balticus a prehistoric species of pauropod that was found in Baltic Amber.

There are two orders: Hexamerocerata and Tetramerocerata; Hexamerocerata has a purely tropical range, while in Tetramerocerata most genera are subcosmopolitan. Hexamerocerata has a 6-segmented and strongly telescopic antennal stalk and a 12-segmented trunk with 12 tergites and 11 pairs of legs. The representatives are white and proportionately long and large. The one family in this order, Millotauropodidae, has one genus and a few species. Tetramerocerata has a 4-segmented and scarcely telescopic antennal stalk, 6 tergites, and 8–10 pairs of legs. Representatives of this order are often small (sometimes very small), and white or brownish. Most species have nine pairs of legs as adults. Adults in four genera (Cauvetauropus, Aletopauropus, Zygopauropus, and Amphipauropus) have only eight pairs of legs, however, and adult females in the genus Decapauropus have either nine or ten pairs of legs. The families in this order include Pauropodidae, Afrauropodidae, Brachypauropodidae, and Eurypauropodidae. Most genera and species belong to the family Pauropodidae.

Behavior and diet
Pauropods are shy of light, and will attempt to distance themselves from it. Pauropods occasionally migrate upwards or downwards throughout the soil based on moisture levels. They feed on mold, fungi, and occasionally even the root hairs of plants. Paurapods have a distinctive method of movement characterized by bursts of speed and frequent changes of direction.

As their bodies are too soft to be able to dig and burrow, Pauropods follow roots and crevices in the soil, sometimes all the way down to the surface of the groundwater.

Gallery

References

Further reading

External links

Checklist of British Pauropoda - Natural History Museum
Pauropoda - Ohio State University

Myriapods
Arthropod classes
Bartonian first appearances
Extant Eocene first appearances